Ben Zemanski (born May 12, 1988 in Pittsburgh, Pennsylvania) is an American retired soccer player and current assistant coach for the Portland Pilots.

Career

College and Amateur
Zemanski attended the Cuyahoga Valley Christian Academy, where he was a 2005 NSCAA All-American, and played college soccer at the University of Akron. He was named the Zips' Newcomer of the Year in 2006, was named to the All-MAC Second Team and was an Academic All-MAC honoree as a junior in 2008, and was named to the CoSida Academic All-America Third Team, the All-Mid-American Conference Second Team, the MAC Academic Team, and was one of ten finalists for the Lowe's Senior CLASS Award as a senior in 2009.

During his college years Zemanski also played for the Cleveland Internationals in the USL Premier Development League.

Professional
Zemanski was drafted in the third round (forty-seventh overall) of the 2010 MLS SuperDraft by Chivas USA. He made his professional debut on April 17, 2010, in a game against Houston Dynamo, and scored his first professional goal on the opening day of the 2011 MLS season, a 3–2 defeat to Sporting Kansas City.

On March 5, 2018, Zemanski signed with Pittsburgh Riverhounds of the United Soccer League for a one-year contract.

On May 26, 2019, Zemanski announced his retirement from professional soccer.

Coaching
Three days after announcing his retirement, Zemanski was announced as an assistant coach for the Portland Pilots.

Honors

Club
Portland Timbers
MLS Cup: 2015
Western Conference (playoffs): 2015
Western Conference (regular season): 2013

References

External links
 
 Akron Zips bio

1988 births
Living people
American soccer players
Akron Zips men's soccer players
Cleveland Internationals players
Chivas USA players
Portland Timbers players
Portland Timbers 2 players
Soccer players from Akron, Ohio
Chivas USA draft picks
University of Akron alumni
USL League Two players
Major League Soccer players
USL Championship players
Association football midfielders